Djuro Zec (Gaj: Đuro Zec; born 6 March 1990) is a Serbian footballer who plays as a right winger for Vietnamese club Hanoi.

References

External links
 
 Đuro Zec stats at utakmica.rs 
 

1990 births
Living people
Footballers from Novi Sad
Association football midfielders
Serbian footballers
Serbian expatriate footballers
Serbian expatriate sportspeople in Bosnia and Herzegovina
Expatriate footballers in Bosnia and Herzegovina
Serbian expatriate sportspeople in Vietnam
Expatriate footballers in Vietnam
Serbian First League players
Serbian SuperLiga players
Premier League of Bosnia and Herzegovina players
FK ČSK Čelarevo players
FK Srem players
FK Proleter Novi Sad players
FK Donji Srem players
FK Borac Čačak players
FK Voždovac players
FK Napredak Kruševac players
FK Krupa players
FK TSC Bačka Topola players
Hanoi FC players